This is the main list of folk dances of the Indian state of Odisha.  It is a non-categorized, index list of specific dances.  There may also be listed dances which could either be considered a specific dance or a family of related dances, depending on your perspective.  For example, Jatra, Chhau dance and Ravana Chhaya can be considered a single dance style or a family of related dances. The purpose of the page is to have as complete an index as possible.

Specific dances are listed below in alphabetical order the districts of Odisha.

Anugul 

 Rabana Chhaya
 Changu (Pauti Bhuyan- Palahada)
 Dhol Nishan Dance
 Danda Venakar Nacha
 Kharia Dance
 Singha Badya
 Animal Pallet

Balangir 
 Bajasal
 Bangrori
 Chhilolai
 Dalkhai
 Danda Nacha
 Dhaap
 Dulduli
 Ghoomr
 Humo
 Jaiphula
 Jamera Ghoda Nacha
 Kalanga Danda
 Karma
 Keisabadi
 Laxmi Puran
 Nachnia
 Paguna Nacha
 Parbha
 Rasarkeli
 Samprada
 Sanchar
 Sankirtan

Bargarh 
 Dalkhai
 Rasarkeli
 Mawla Jhula
 Jai Phula
 Janhi Phula
 Nachnia
 Bajnia
 Dhap
 Parva
 Karma
 Sanchar 
 Sabda Nrutya
 Nuni Bhuasen
 Laxmi Pura
 Kaisa Badi

Balasore 
 Chhow Dance
 Jhumar Dance
 Kathi Dance
 Chadheiya-Chadheiyani Dance
 Women Pala
 Laudi Dance

Bhadrak 
 Mugal Tamasa
 Baunsa Rani
 Chadheiya Dance
 Kathi Pala
 Sakhi Pala
 Daskathia
 Women pala

Boudh 
 Karma Dance
 Danda Nacha
 Dalkhai and subvariants
 Ramaleela

Cuttack 
 Chaiti Ghoda
 Ghanta Patua
 Medha Nacha
 Jodi Nagara
 Women Pala
 Dhana Koila (Kalatirtha, Badamba)
 Ram Leela
 Krushna Leela 
 Bamboo Dance
 Kandhei Dance
 Kela Keluni Dance 
 Laudi Dance
 Paika Dance 
 Pala
 Dasa Kathia
 Kendara geeta
 Halia Geeta
 Maipi Kandana Geeta
 Dhuduki Geeta
 Jhamu Nacha 
 Jatra
 Raja Doli Geet

Dhenkanal 
 Laudi and Ogal Dance
 Gopal Laudi
 Danda Nacha
 Paika Akhada
 Changu Dance
 Gumura
 Bandi Nacha
 Odissi Kirtan
 Dhuduki Nacha
 Kendera Song
 Kandhei Dance (puppet dance)
 Mahila (women) Pala
 Baunsa Nacha
 Chhou Dance

Deogarh 
 Karma Dance
 Danda Nacha
 Parva Dance
 Rasarkeli
 Women Pala
 Laxmi Puran

Ganjam 
 Jodi Shankha
 Ranappa
 Chadheiya Dance
 Pasumukha Dance
 Bagha Nacha (tiger body paint)
 Danda Nacha
 Patara Saura
 Dhana Koila
 Sakhi Nacha
 Dhumpa
 Ghudki
 Naba Durga Nacha
 Baunsa Rani Nacha
 Gola Nacha
 Kandhei Nacha (puppet dance)
 Bharat Leela
 Radha Prema Leela
 Prahallada Nataka
 Rama Leela
 Changu Nacha
 Krushna Leela
 Hari Katha
 Bhoot Keli

Gajapati 
 Paika Akhada (Paralakhemundi Mandi)
 Lanjia Saura Dance
 Bir Badya (war time drumming)
 Gola Nata
 Bhoot Keli Dance (Kasinagar)
 Muan Dance (Paralakhemundi)
 Tribal dance of Tetisingi

Jajpur 
 Mugal Tamasa
 Kathi Pala
 Sakhi Pala
 Dasakathi
 Women Pala
 Jhipa nacha
 Folk Opera

Jagatsinghpur 
 Chaiti Ghoda
 Ghanta Patua
 Medha Nacha
 Jodi Nagara
 Women Pala
 Kumar purnima Gita
 Rama Lila
 Kendera Gita

Jharsuguda 
 Dalkhai
 Rasarkeli
 Mayla Joda
 Sanchar
 Samprada
 Jhumar
 Dand Dance
 Women pala
 Bharni
 Sulaha Bharni
 Laxmi Purana

Kendrapada 
 Ghanta patua
 Chaiti ghoda
 Women Pala
 kalika Nacha
 Laudi Nacha
 Bull Dance
 Guduki
 Giti Natya

Kandhamal 
 Singha Badya
 Danda Nacha
 Dhangeda - Dhangigedi
 Krahenda
 Pitha khia Dance

Keonjhar 
 Kandhei (puppet) Dance (Roda puppet) 
 Changu Dance 
 Juang Dance 
 Ho-Ho Dance 
 Women Pala
 Daskathia

Kalahandi 

 Ghumura Dance
 Dalkhai
 Parva
 Dhaap
 Lariha Dance
 Tukel Ghumra
 Bajasal, Banabadi

Khurda 
 Paika Akhada Dance
 Gotipua Dance
 Women Pala
 Chaiti Ghoda Nacha
 Danda Nata
 Gouda Nata
 Kela Keluni Nata
 Puppet (String)
 Guduki
 Rama Lila

Koraput 
 Desia nata
 Kandha Dance
 Kathi Dance (Patangi)
 Dhemsa
 Durua Dance
 Changu Dance
 Salapa Nisan (Kasipur)
 Paraja Dance
 Gadaba

Mayurbhanj 

 Jhumair
 Chhau dance
 Firkal dance
 Kathi Nacha
 Santali Dance
 Women Pala
 Sakhi Nacha
 Tuila Dance
 Kharia Dance
 Karma

Malkangiri 
 Koya Dance
 Changu Dance
 Paraja Dance
 Sakhi Dance

Nawarangpur 
 Kui Dance
 Dudra Dance
 Kathi Nacha
 Koya Dance
 Dondahalia Dance

Nayagarh 
 Dhumpa Dance
 kalesi Dance
 Dinda Dhangedi Dance
 Matia Dance 
 Dubu Duba Dance
 Dala mankudi Dance
 Paika Dance
 Kela Keluni Dance
 Dhudki Nacha
 Sankirtana
 Pala
 Dasakathia
 Rasa
 Rama Leela 
 Dauri Dance 
 Danda Nacha
 Bir Badya

Nuapada 
 Lariha Dance
 Tukel Ghumra
 Devi Dance 
 Jura Juri Dance
 Madli Dance 
 Laxmi Puran
 Dhaap
 Parva
 Ghoomra

Puri 

 Gotipua Dance
 Mahari Dance
 Paika Akhada
 Banati Dance
 Stick Dance
 Medha Dance
 Mask Dance
 Pattachitra Painting (visual art)
 Stone Carving (sculpture)
 Applique art
 Radha Premalila (Nimapada)
 Mahari Dance
 Naga Dance

Rayagada 
 Lanjia Saura Dance
 Paraja Saura Dance
 Salapa Nisan Dance
 Saura painting

Sambalpur 
 Dalkhai
 Rasarkeli
 Jaiphula
 Janhiphula
 Dulha Biha
 Mayla Joda
 Bharni
 Ghudka
 Dhaap
 Parva
 Karma
 Khanjani Dance
 Sanchar
 Chutku Chuta
 Kishan Dance
 Huma Bouli
 Chena Guda Dance 
 Sua Dance

Sonepur 
 Laxmi Puran
 Rasarkeli
 Jaiphula
 Janhiphula
 Rasarkeli
 Mayla Joda
 Bharni
 Ghudka
 Dhaap
 Parva
 Karma
 Khanjani Dance
 Painri Dance

Sundargarh 
 Jhumair
 Domkach
 Karma Naach
 Laxmi Puran
 Rasarkeli
 Jaiphula
 Janhiphula
 Oram Dance
 Mayla Joda
 Bharni
 Ghudka
 Dhaap
 Parva
 Khanjani Dance
 Women Pala
 Samprada
 Kishan Dance
 Munda Dance
 Paudi Bhuyan

References 
 Folk Art Forms of Odisha. Odisha Sangeet Natak Akademi

See also 
 List of Indian folk dances

 Odisha
India dance-related lists